The Minsheng Bank Building (also known as Wuhan International Securities Building) is a supertall skyscraper located in Wuhan, Hubei, China. It is the tallest building in mainland China entirely steel-structured lacking a reinforced concrete core.

See also 
 China Minsheng Bank
 List of tallest freestanding structures in the world
 List of tallest freestanding steel structures
 List of tallest buildings in Wuhan

References

External links 
 
 
 

Skyscraper office buildings in Wuhan
Bank buildings in China
China Minsheng Bank
Office buildings completed in 2007